Hannah Scott may refer to:

Hannah Scott (footballer) (born 1990), retired Australian rules footballer who played for the Western Bulldogs
Hannah Scott (General Hospital), character on General Hospital
Hannah Scott (rower), British Olympian rower